Thud Ridge: American Aces in 'Nam is a computer game published by Three-Sixty Pacific in 1988 for the Commodore 64 and MS-DOS.

Plot
Thud Ridge is a combat flight simulator that allows the player to pilot a Republic F-105 Thunderchief—a "Thud"—during the Vietnam War. The player must contend with enemy MiGs, SAMs, flak, and a MiG ace known as the Grey Ghost. Thud Ridge presents 10 missions, with the degree of simulation difficulty decided by selecting either Lieutenant, Captain, or Colonel level. The player earns the Bronze Star by completing Missions 1 through 3, the Silver Star and a promotion to Colonel upon completion of Missions 4 through 6, and membership in the Wild Weasel Thud Drivers if the player accomplishes all ten missions.

Gameplay
This game has few commands to learn in order to operate the aircraft. There is no digitized sound, just tinny beeps that indicate actions such as weapons firing. The player handles control of the aircraft by joystick, keyboard, or keypad. The player uses the joystick or keypad to direct the jet’s flight; the keyboard allows the player to input other control commands. The game possesses four basic screens, each offering different aspects of the jet's flight. One screen allows the player to view the aircraft functions screen. The main display presents a real-time view of the player's Thud and the geography of the area over which the plane is flying, as well as weapons and firing information. The plane has an automatic weapons cursor, the shape of which determines the weapon in use. The Engine Function Panel can appear below the real-time graphics display, and presents factors such as the engine and nozzle temperatures and fuel levels on gauges. Other data includes the plane's throttle, an afterburner indicator, the elapsed time of the mission, a radar-lock warning, and a graphic display of the Thud and the weapons remaining aboard. Also available is a screen that shows where SAM installations are located and a map screen.

Reception
The game was reviewed in 1989 in Dragon #151 by Hartley, Patricia, and Kirk Lesser in "The Role of Computers" column. The reviewers gave the game 3 out of 5 stars. A 1992 Computer Gaming World survey of wargames with modern settings gave the game two stars out of five.

Reviews
ASM (Aktueller Software Markt) - Nov, 1989
Computer Gaming World - Jun, 1991

See also
Thud Ridge

References

External links
Thud Ridge at MobyGames
Thud Ridge at GameFAQs
Thud Ridge at GameSpot
Review in Info

1988 video games
DOS games
Commodore 64 games
Flight simulation video games
Video games developed in the United States
Video games set in Vietnam
Vietnam War video games